Dolenje Vrhpolje is a settlement south of Šentjernej at the foot of the Gorjanci Hills in southeastern Slovenia. The area is part of the traditional region of Lower Carniola. It is now included in the Southeast Slovenia Statistical Region.

References

External links
Dolenje Vrhpolje on Geopedia

Populated places in the Municipality of Šentjernej